Lawson are an English pop rock band, consisting of Andy Brown (lead vocals, rhythm guitar), Ryan Fletcher (bass guitar, keyboards, backing vocals), Joel Peat (lead guitar, keyboards, co-lead vocals) and Adam Pitts (drums, backing vocals, percussion). The band's debut album, Chapman Square, was released on 22 October 2012 and reached number three on the UK Albums Chart. On 17 April 2020, the band released "Lovers", their first single after their 4-year hiatus. To date, the band have achieved seven UK top 20 hit singles. They are named after Dorset-based surgeon David Lawson, who performed life-saving surgery on Andy Brown.

History

2009–2012: Early career and breakthrough
The band was formed in late 2009 and was earlier known as "The Groves" but they later changed their name to "Lawson" when David Lawson performed life-saving brain surgery on the lead singer Andy Brown. Lawson began recording material in early 2010. Acoustic versions of their early original material as well as covers of artists such as Bruno Mars and Adele built up an online fanbase. They soon began playing gigs around the United Kingdom, including the Wireless Festival and the Ultrasound Festival.

On 8 September 2011, it was announced that the band had been signed to Polydor Records, with a lucrative two-album deal on the cards. After signing to a major label, Lawson were tasked with opening for acts such as The Wanted, Will Young, Avril Lavigne, and Jessie J. The band toured extensively at the beginning of 2012, fitting in a headline tour of the UK in January and another in May as well as a one-off intimate show at Monto Water Rats in London which was streamed worldwide in April. During this time the band worked on material for their debut album with writers and producers such as Carl Falk and John Shanks.

2012–2013: Chapman Square

The band's first official single, "When She Was Mine", was released in May 2012 and reached number four on the UK Singles Chart. Following the single release, the band undertook their second headline tour, selling out venues in London, Glasgow, Manchester, Leeds, Nottingham, Sheffield and Birmingham. The band's second single, "Taking Over Me", was released on in August 2012, peaking at number three in the UK. In the summer of 2012, Lawson performed at T in the Park, V Festival and alongside Bruce Springsteen at Hard Rock Calling. They also announced a Hometown Tour, playing dates from October through November in their respective home towns and London, where they reside now. In October 2012, the band released their third official single, "Standing in the Dark", which reached number six in the UK. The band later revealed that their debut album, Chapman Square, would be released on 22 October. Guitarist Joel Peat said of the album: "We're all so excited to release our debut album, we've been building up to it for the past four years, and the album's title for us is special, because it is the first place that we played together as a band. Going out on tour to support the album is amazing too. Doing shows in our home towns feels like the perfect way to celebrate. Performing live is what we love the most, so to be able to play our biggest venues to date in the cities where we grew up is very special." Lawson cited many inspirations for their debut album, including John Mayer and Taylor Swift. On 22 October 2012, Lawson released Chapman Square, peaking at number four in the UK Albums Chart. The album was later certified gold. The band finished the year performing at the Oxford Street Christmas Lights switch on with Robbie Williams and at the Capital FM Jingle Bell Ball where their performance was watched by Taylor Swift.

At the beginning of 2013, Lawson played their first headline shows in the US and Canada selling out New York's Bowery Ballroom, The Troubadour in LA and The Mod Club in Canada. In February, they embarked on the Chapman Square tour, playing 18 sold-out shows in the UK and Ireland. While working on new tracks for the repack of Chapman Square they visited Southeast Asia and Australia as well as announcing numerous festival dates including T in the Park, V Festival and Hard Rock Calling for the second year running and Isle of Wight Festival for the first time.

2013: Chapman Square – Chapter II 
"Brokenhearted", featuring American rapper B.o.B, was released as the lead single from the repackaged version of Chapman Square in July 2013, reaching number six in the UK. B.o.B flew over to the UK to perform Brokenhearted with the band at Wembley Stadium for the Capital FM Summertime Ball. The band announced their second single, "Juliet", while on tour in the US for the second time in 2013. The track was released on 13 October 2013. British model and actress Kelly Brook stars as the titular character in the video. The band were included in the line-up of the iTunes Festival 2013, opening for Jessie J. Lawson began their biggest headline tour to date, the "Everywhere We Go Tour", in September 2013. The repackaged version of their debut album titled Chapman Square – Chapter II was released on 21 October 2013. The reissue featured all twelve of the songs from standard edition of the Chapman Square (though not the full sixteen of the deluxe edition), plus six new songs. The deluxe edition of Chapman Square – Chapter II includes a second disc including acoustic songs and a short tour film.

In December 2013, an official mobile trivia game was launched for the band by SoshiGames of Birmingham, UK. The game tests the player's knowledge of the band, the members and their music.

2014–2015: "Roads" and Lawson EP
In 2014, according to the updates at Facebook by Ryan Fletcher, he wrote "Lawson have been in Iceland to do a photo shoot for their new album, and maybe to film a video... More news soon!"

On 2 February 2015 Lawson announced via Twitter that their first gig (after releasing the new album) would be at live at Leeds on 2 May 2015.

On 10 March 2015, Lawson announced the name of the lead single of their second album "Roads" after being played for the first time on in demand radio. Lawson then released a lyric video to "Roads" straight after play being posted to their YouTube channel. "Roads" was released on 24 May 2015.

The band also announced that their album would be titled Perspective, and stated it was due to be released sometime in 2015. This was delayed after band member Andy Brown was taken to hospital with liver failure. Perspective was released on 8 July 2016.

In October, Lawson released a self-titled extended play globally, except in the US and Asia. It included their singles "Roads" and "Under the Sun". The Australia/New Zealand release of Lawson coincided with their support of Robbie Williams' Australia and New Zealand tour, and features the four tracks from deluxe version of Chapman Square, which was not released in Australia.

2016: Perspective
On Twitter in January 2016 Lawson announced that their single "Money" was issued on 29 January 2016. Lawson also announced a video for the single. The music video for "Money" was released on 4 February 2016 before the single was released on 18 March 2016.

Lawson also announced the release of their second album for the summer of 2016. The name of the album was officially revealed in May 2016 on the band's Twitter as Perspective. The record was released on 8 July 2016 following the release of the album, Lawson were dropped from their joint record deal with Polydor and Global.

2017–present: Cedarmont and CMD Z
Brown announced he signed a major deal with Decca and would be releasing a solo country album. He released a comment on his social media saying the band has not split he is just using his time to focus on the solo album. Andy also announced in May 2017 that he and his wife, Joey are expecting a baby. On 30 October 2017, they both welcomed their son, Knox Orlando Brown into the world. On 14 December 2018, his debut album Cedarmont was released.

On 6 April 2020, the band announced they have been signed to record label Cooking Vinyl. On 17 April 2020, the band released "Lovers" their first single after their 4-year hiatus. On 2 July 2021, Lawson released their third album CMD Z.

Members
Andy Brown (born 8 May 1987 in Fazakerley, Liverpool) Andy is the lead singer and guitarist of the band. He is the oldest member of group and previously dated Mollie King from The Saturdays. He used to be in the boy band Avenue along with Max George of The Wanted. He attended St Bede's High School, Ormskirk and Winstanley College, Wigan. He proposed to his girlfriend, Joey McDowall, in the band's new music video "Where My Love Goes".
Adam "James" Pitts (born 24 December 1990 in Brighton) is the drummer of the band. Adam is the youngest member of Lawson.
Joel Gilchrist Peat (born 27 June 1990 in Mansfield, Nottinghamshire) plays lead guitar. He and Ryan attended the same university.
Ryan "Gary" Fletcher (born 9 January 1990 in Chesterfield, Derbyshire) is the bass guitarist of the band. He and Joel attended the same university (ACM).

Discography

Studio albums

Extended plays

Singles

Promotional singles

Music videos

Notes

References

English boy bands
English pop music groups
English pop rock music groups
Musical groups established in 2009
Musical quartets
Musical groups from Dorset